Terror Firma is a Big Finish Productions audio drama based on the long-running British science fiction television series Doctor Who. The story follows on directly from the previous Eighth Doctor audio drama The Next Life and flashes back to scenes that take place before (and lead into) the first Eighth Doctor audio story Storm Warning.
Terror Firma was voted Doctor Who Magazine readers' favourite of the previous year's Doctor Who audio plays in the annual poll held in 2006.

Plot
After returning from the Divergent Universe, the Eighth Doctor, Charley Pollard and C'rizz land in a corridor and are captured by Davros and several Daleks. Charley and C'rizz are taken into a cell, but Davros wants to talk to the Doctor. In Davros's lab, the Doctor notices Davros is suffering from mood swings and sometimes talks in a different voice. Davros needs the Doctor's help for something, but cannot explain what. Charley and C'rizz are freed by a woman called Gemma Griffin, who starts to lead them to an escape route. Elsewhere, a woman called Harriet Griffin is throwing a party, but her son, Samson Griffin, is in a bad mood and angrily goes outside when his mother mentions his sister, as he believes his sister only existed in his mother's imagination. As he runs outside, he begins to hear the Doctor's and Gemma's voices in his head. Meanwhile, Charley is separated from C'rizz after Gemma closes a hatch door to slow down the pursuing Daleks; C'rizz assumes Charley has been killed and agrees to join Gemma's resistance. Charley finds another way to the surface and finds Sam about to throw himself off a cliff, but, as she tries, Sam reveals that the Daleks have invaded Earth. Meanwhile, the Doctor comes to the conclusion that Davros is losing his identity and mentally becoming the Emperor Dalek. Davros begs the Doctor to help him regain his identity.
   
Davros reveals that he has made a clone of his body and asks the Doctor to transfer his mind into the clone so he can sever his ties to the Daleks and lead a normal life. A mutant then approaches, and C'rizz kills it. Elsewhere, Charley takes Samson back to the house and confronts Harriet about the Dalek base. Harriet explains that, since the Daleks have left the humans in the area alone, they have decided to throw parties to distract themselves from worrying about the Daleks. Samson has a fit and asks Charley for the Doctor. Davros tells the Doctor about what happened after the destruction of Skaro. After being left alone in the dark for years, Davros created the virus that the Fourth Doctor discussed with him, which, when it was unleashed on the earth, mutated millions of people into Dalek creatures. Davros then gives the Doctor a second virus that will completely wipe out all life and offers to let him use it, but the Doctor refuses. Davros shows him what Charley and C'rizz are doing and tells Gemma to give C'rizz a gun and ask him to shoot her. Davros then changes the screen to the party where Samson is still having a fit, and Harriet explains that Samson disappeared with Gemma before the Daleks came, but returned later with no memory of Gemma or where he had been. Charley finds an implant in Samson's head and shows him the TARDIS key, which he recognises. The Doctor finds Samson and Gemma's faces familiar; Davros reveals that they were the Doctor's old companions before he met Charley.
    
The Doctor now remembers that Samson was working at a library that the Doctor visited, and Samson and Gemma decided to follow him back to the TARDIS, where they joined his adventures. At the same time, Davros's escape pod was blown into the time vortex by the exploding Dalek Mothership, where he was picked up by an alien time ship in which he killed all the inhabitants. The TARDIS landed on the ship, and Samson and Gemma found Davros, who forced them into taking him on board the TARDIS, where he overpowered the Doctor, deleted the Doctor's memories of his recent travels, linked Samson's mind to the TARDIS and took Samson and Gemma home, and left, leaving the Doctor to experience the events of Storm Warning. Samson returned to his home, but experienced the TARDIS's travels via his dreams, which Davros used to track the Doctor. Gemma then spread Davros's virus, giving him enough Dalek creatures to create an army of Daleks. Gemma is then ordered to ask C'rizz for the gun back, and they carry on. Samson now has his memory back, and Harriet reveals that her party guests are in fact the British resistance and that the parties are just a cover story. The Doctor leaves the lab, despite Davros's pleas for the Doctor to grant him euthanasia. After the Doctor reaches the surface he concludes that the Daleks are only pretending to be loyal to Davros, but he can't work out why; he decides to wait for the French resistance with the others. As they reach the end of the tunnel, C'rizz accuses Gemma of manipulating him, and as she opens a door a Dalek greets her; Gemma then reveals that the Daleks are posing as the French resistance.

The Daleks explain that they want to kill Davros to free themselves from him; the Doctor agrees to help them. In the tunnel, Gemma reveals herself to be a Dalek agent, explaining that the Daleks need a new Dalek Emperor and have chosen C'rizz. He destroys one with his bare hands, but they show him the casing and force him inside by threatening to kill an unflinching Gemma, and the machine then attempts to mentally turn him into a Dalek. The Doctor removes Samson's link to the TARDIS and confronts Davros. Despite Davros's request, the Doctor refuses to kill Davros, instead watching as Daleks enter the room. They in turn refuse Davros' order to exterminate the Doctor. He has threatened to use Davros's virus unless they leave Earth, but the Daleks insist that the Doctor has promised them a new emperor. C'rizz is freed and arrives, but without Gemma who, he later reveals to the Doctor privately, "didn't make it". The Daleks destroy the clone and so Davros's Dalek Emperor personality finally overpowers the rest of his mind; he leaves to become the leader of the Daleks. The Doctor tells C'rizz to keep his meeting with Gemma secret, removes Davros's taint from Samson's mind and gives Harriet the virus as a deterrent to defend Earth if the Daleks threaten to return.

The episode concludes when the Doctor takes the TARDIS to Blackpool. While he and Charley enjoy it, however, C'rizz stays in bed thinking about all the people he's "saved" – that is, killed – talking to them in his mind. Among the voices is now a Dalek – and Gemma... and he drifts off to sleep wondering when he might have to "save" the Doctor and Charley.

Cast
The Doctor — Paul McGann
Charley — India Fisher
C'rizz — Conrad Westmaas
Davros — Terry Molloy
Harriet Griffin — Julia Deakin
Samson Griffin — Lee Ingleby
Gemma Griffin — Lizzie Hopley
Dalek voices — Nicholas Briggs

External links
Big Finish Productions - Terror Firma

2005 audio plays
Eighth Doctor audio plays
Davros audio plays
Dalek audio plays
Fiction about amnesia